Waldemar Bonsels (21 February 1880  in Ahrensburg – 31 July 1952 in Ambach, Münsing) was a German writer.

Waldemar Bonsels's most famous work is the children's book Die Biene Maja und ihre Abenteuer (Maya the Bee and her Adventures, translated as The Adventures of Maya the Bee). This work served the basis for a Japanese animated television series named Maya the Honey Bee in the mid-1970s, as well as a Croatian opera for children written by Bruno Bjelinski, making Bonsels work known to an even greater audience. The opera was staged in 2008 in Villach, Austria at the Carinthian Summer Music Festival. Himmelsvolk (People in the Sky) is a sequel with a more philosophical focus, describing in mystical terms the unity of all creation and its relationship to God.

He wrote a number of novels and shorter stories dealing with love as Eros and the higher level of divine love in the spirit of romanticism (Eros und die Evangelien, Menschenwege, Narren und Helden, etc.), with the relationship between man and nature in a simple life unchanged by modern civilisation (Anjekind, etc.) and also a historical novel about the time of Jesus (Der Grieche Dositos).

He travelled extensively in Europe and Asia. Indienfahrt (Voyage in India) is the fruit of one of these travels.

Bonsels was an outspoken antisemite and expressed his approval of Nazi politics against Jews in 1933, calling the Jew "a deadly enemy" who was "poisoning the culture" in an article (NSDAP und Judentum) which was widely published.

Bibliography

Books
 Die Biene Maja und ihre Abenteuer (1912) (Maya the Bee and her Adventures, translated as The Adventures of Maya the Bee) 
 Himmelsvolk: Ein Buch von Blumen, Tieren und Gott (1915) (People of the Sky)
 Indienfahrt (1916)
 Menschenwege: Aus den Notizen eines Vagabunden (1917)
 Das Unjekind: Eine Erzählung (101.-120. edition, 1922)
 Eros und die Evangelien: Aus den Notizen eines Vagabunden (67.-90. thousand, 1922)
 Wartalun: eine Schlossgeschichte (101-114. edition, 1922)
 Weihnachtsspiel: eine Dichtung (1922)
 Jugendnovellen (1923)
 Narren und Helden: Aus den Notizen eines Vagabunden (24.-26. thousand, 1924)
 Mario und die Tiere (1928) (Mario and the Animals, translated as The Adventures of Mario)
 Dositos: Ein mythischer Bericht aus der Zweitwende (1949)
 Der Reiter in der Wüste: Eine Amerikafahrt (1935)
 Mario Ein Leben im Walde (1939) (Mario A Life in the Woods)
 Efeu: Erzählungen und Begegnungen (1953)
Translations

Short Stories
 Die Winde
 Angelika
 Scholander
 Die Stadt am Strom
 Asja

Essays
 NSDAP und Judentum (1933)

References

External links

 
 
 
 Waldemar Bonsels at IMDb

1880 births
1952 deaths
20th-century German novelists
20th-century German male writers
People from Stormarn (district)
People from the Province of Schleswig-Holstein
German children's writers
German male non-fiction writers
German male novelists
German travel writers
Maya the Bee
Writers from Schleswig-Holstein